Arvid Nilssen (25 December 1913 – 24 March 1976) was a Norwegian actor, revue artist and singer. He was regarded as one of the leading comedians in Norwegian revue.

Biography
Nilsen  was born at Alvdal in Hedmark, Norway.
He made his debut in Oslo at the  Scala Teater in 1935, and played at Chat Noir from 1937 and most of his career.  He also participated in tours, recorded films, and was a  guest on numerous  radio programs.
He was awarded the Leonard Statuette in 1968 and was depicted on a Norwegian postage tamp in 2001. He died in Oslo and was buried at 
Vestre gravlund.

External links

References

1913 births
1976 deaths
People from Alvdal
Norwegian male stage actors
Norwegian male comedians
Leonard Statuette winners
20th-century Norwegian male actors
20th-century Norwegian male singers
20th-century Norwegian singers
Burials at Vestre gravlund